Francisco Lorenzo (born October 27, 1971) is a Dominican former professional boxer who competed from 2000 to 2014. He challenged for the WBC super featherweight title in 2008, and originally won the WBC interim title that year, but was not awarded the title due to the controversy of his win over Humberto Soto.

Pro career
In June 2005, Francisco upset future WBA World, IBF and WBA Lightweight champion Nate Campbell.

Interim WBC Super Featherweight Championship
On December 20, 2008 Lorenzo lost his second fight with Humberto Soto by twelve round decision, the bout was for the Interim WBC Super Featherweight championship.

Professional boxing record

References

External links

Light-welterweight boxers
1971 births
Living people
Dominican Republic male boxers